María Matilde Alea Fernández (March 6, 1918 – November 9, 2006) was a Cuban composer and teacher.

A native of Camajuaní, Alea began her musical studies in Pinar del Río; later she matriculated at the Orbón Conservatory in Havana. Her compositions include works for piano, such as the Miniaturas ritmicas cubanas of 1978.

References

1918 births
2006 deaths
People from Camajuaní
Cuban women composers
Cuban classical composers
Women classical composers
20th-century Cuban musicians
20th-century classical composers
20th-century women composers